Charles Henry Thompson (1882–1972) served as chief justice of the Illinois Supreme Court in 1945, 1946, 1949, and 1950 after being elected to the Illinois Supreme Court in 1942. 
 He was born 11 Dec 1882 near Mount Vernon, Posey County, Indiana to Lewis (also known as Louis) Thompson, a farmer, and his wife Emma Monroe Thompson. 
  In 1884, he and his family moved to Harrisburg in Saline County, Illinois.  By 1910, his father had begun mining coal, and Charles was working as a bookkeeper in the coal office.   In 1914, Charles married Ethel K. Knight of Harrisburg.

Thompson left Harrisburg to attend law school in Chicago.  He graduated from the Chicago-Kent College of Law (1918) and was admitted to the Illinois Bar in 1919.   While in law school, he worked as a law clerk and a stenographer.  He returned to Harrisburg to practice law and entered politics.  In 1920, he was elected State's Attorney for Saline County, Illinois. In 1926, as a Republican, he ran for State Senate and was elected.  Other notable areas of service included the Lincoln Memorial Commission (1929-1932) and The Illinois Century of Progress Commission (1933-1934).  From 1936-1937, he served as president of the Federation of Local Bar Associations of the first Supreme Judicial District. In 1951, he retired from the Illinois Supreme Court and returned to Harrisburg to practice law.

He was a member of the First United Methodist Church in Harrisburg, and also a member of the Harrisburg Masonic Lodge and Knights Templar.  On 3 Nov 1967 his wife, Ethel, died    and was buried at Sunset Hill Cemetery in Harrisburg. Former Illinois Chief Justice Thompson died on 26 Nov 1972 and was also buried at Sunset Hill.

References 

https://web.archive.org/web/20130927073826/http://www.state.il.us/court/SupremeCourt/Historical/Chiefs.asp
WPA Indiana Birth Index Entry for Charles Thompson b. 11 Dec 1882 in Posey County, IN, original data in book H-1 page 62. Ancestry.com. Indiana Births, 1880-1920 [database on-line]. Provo, UT, USA: Ancestry.com Operations Inc, 2000.
Original data: Works Progress Administration. Index to Birth Records. Indiana: Indiana Works Progress Administration, 1938-1940.
 Entry for Louis Thompson family, Year: 1900; Census Place: Harrisburg, Saline, Illinois; Roll: 342; Page: 10A; Enumeration District: 0084; FHL microfilm: 1240342, online at www.ancestry.com.
 Obituary of Lewis Thompson, The Daily Register (Harrisburg, IL), 15 Sep 1933, page 1.
 Entry for Lewis Thompson family, Year: 1910; Census Place: Harrisburg Ward 1, Saline, Illinois; Roll: T624_324; Page: 9A; Enumeration District: 0103; FHL microfilm: 1374337, online at www.ancestry.com.

Chief Justices of the Illinois Supreme Court
1882 births
1972 deaths
20th-century American judges
Chicago-Kent College of Law alumni
Justices of the Illinois Supreme Court